Comin' from Where I'm From is the second studio album by American singer Anthony Hamilton. It was released on September 23, 2003, by So So Def Recordings and Arista Records. The album debuted at number 33 on the US Billboard 200 with first-week sales of 33,000 copies, while peaking at number six on the Top R&B/Hip-Hop Albums chart. Comin' from Where I'm From was certified platinum certification by the Recording Industry Association of America (RIAA) on December 2, 2004, and as of December 2005, it had sold 1.2 million copies in the United States.

The album's second single, "Charlene", peaked at number 19 on the Billboard Hot 100 and at number five on the Hot R&B/Hip-Hop Songs chart, becoming Hamilton's most successful single to date. The album earned Hamilton three Grammy Award nominations in 2004—Best Traditional R&B Vocal Performance, Best R&B Song (both for the title track), and Best Contemporary R&B Album—and one in 2005—Best Male R&B Vocal Performance for "Charlene". British DJ Ben Pearce sampled vocals from the song "Cornbread, Fish & Collard Greens" for his 2013 song "What I Might Do".

Track listing

Sample credits
 "Mama Knew Love" contains samples from "Blueprint (Momma Loves Me)" by Jay-Z and "Free at Last" by Al Green.
 "Lucille" contains re-sung lyrics from "Lucille", written by Roger Bowling and Hal Bynum.

Charts

Weekly charts

Year-end charts

Certifications

|}

Release history

Notes

References

External links
 Album Review at City Pages

2003 albums
Albums produced by James Poyser
Albums produced by Jermaine Dupri
Albums produced by Mark Batson
Anthony Hamilton (musician) albums
Arista Records albums
So So Def Recordings albums